Ernest Ahwireng Obeng (born 8 April 1956) is a retired Ghanaian sprinter who specialized in the 100 metres. His personal best time was 10.21 seconds, achieved in August 1980 in Budapest. Ghana boycotted the Olympic Games that year.
He represented Ghana up to 1986 and Great Britain from then until the end of his career. 

He won the gold medals at the 1979 African Championships and 1982 African Championships, and won a bronze medal at the 1981 Universiade.  Obeng also competed at the 1983 World Championships, and won the British AAA Championships in 1985.

Obeng also represented Africa in the 100 metres at the 1981 IAAF World Cup, finishing second behind Allan Wells of Europe.

He is now in charge of television operations for the International Association of Athletics Federations, working from their offices in Monaco.

Achievements

References

External links 
 
 

1956 births
Living people
Ghanaian male sprinters
Athletes (track and field) at the 1978 Commonwealth Games
Athletes (track and field) at the 1982 Commonwealth Games
Commonwealth Games competitors for Ghana
World Athletics Championships athletes for Ghana
Universiade medalists in athletics (track and field)
Universiade medalists for Ghana
African Games medalists in athletics (track and field)
African Games gold medalists for Ghana
Athletes (track and field) at the 1978 All-Africa Games
Medalists at the 1981 Summer Universiade